Karakaya is a village in Silifke district of Mersin Province, Turkey. It is situated to the west of Göksu River valley. The population of the village was 276 as of 2012. The main economic activity is agriculture; the village produces various fruits like plum and pomegranate.

References

Villages in Silifke District